Volvo F10, F12, and F16 are a series of trucks manufactured by Volvo Trucks between 1977 and 1993. The F10 and F12 were launched in 1977, with many innovative features for its time, most notably a safety cab with high level of ergonomics for the driver. The more powerful F16 was launched in 1987 (at the time of the second facelift). Volvo manufactured about 200,000 trucks in this series between 1977 and 1993.

The basic chassis components and also the driveline components of the trucks, when launched in 1977, were to a large extent based on the ones introduced in 1973 for the Volvo N-series trucks. The numbering on these models tells the engine displacement in litres. Various power outputs were offered, and the engines have gone through several modifications through the years. All engines are straight six-cylinder turbocharged diesel engines of Volvo's own make. In addition to the original flat-roofed version, the spacious, high-roof "Globetrotter" cabin was added as an option during 1979.

The series got two major upgrades during its production. The first one arrived in 1983: it included major changes to the cabin including a larger windscreen and taller roof, and a new chassis with decreased weight and parabolic springs. The engines also got an upgrade, but the power outputs were unchanged. The Globetrotter received a taller windscreen, reaching the top of the higher roof. This model (F10) won the International Truck of the Year Award in 1984.

The second upgrade came in 1987, with the arrival of the powerful F16 and some cosmetic changes and improved aerodynamics. The F16 truck had a new six-cylinder, straight-in-line engine with four valves per cylinder and a high-placed camshaft. It was widely used for hauling large train weights, such as timber trucks in Scandinavia (a market hitherto dominated by Scania AB trucks powered by the Scania V8 engine, and Cummins-powered Sisu trucks in Finland). They were also popular in the road trains of Australia. 

The F-series was replaced by the Volvo FH-series in 1993.

Source

F10
Vehicles introduced in 1977